Adam and Eve is a pair of paintings by German Renaissance master Lucas Cranach the Elder, dating from 1528, housed in the Uffizi, Florence, Italy.
There are other paintings by the same artist with the same title, depicting the subjects either together in a double portrait or separately in a pair of portraits, for instance at the Kunsthistorisches Museum in Vienna, the Courtauld Gallery in London, the Museum der bildenden Künste in Leipzig, and the Art Institute of Chicago.

The two biblical ancestors are portrayed, in two different panels, on a dark background, standing on a barely visible ground. Both hold two small branches which cover their sexual organs. Eve holds the traditional apple, with the serpent coming to her from above from the tree of the knowledge of good and evil. Adam is shown scratching the right crown part of his scalp.

History
The work was part of the Tuscan Grand Dukes' collections since as early as 1688, and has been included in the Uffizi since the beginning of the 18th century. Filippo Baldinucci attributed it to Albrecht Dürer, until the inventory of 1784 assigned it to Cranach.

The subject continues Dürer's anatomy studies, which had culminated in his  large Adam and Eve panels now in the Museo del Prado. These were the first full-size nudes painted by a German artist. During his stay in Vienna, Cranach had frequented some groups of humanists who were close to Dürer, and from there he was inspired to do a first, smaller version of the theme of Adam and Eve in 1510, currently housed at the National Museum in Warsaw.

In popular culture
The pair of Adam and Eve paintings from the Kunsthistorisches Museum were featured in the German television series Dark, where they are displayed in the headquarters of the cult Erit Lux.

Gallery
Other versions of Adam and Eve by the artist include:

Footnotes

Sources

1528 paintings
Paintings by Lucas Cranach the Elder
Paintings by Lucas Cranach the Elder in the Uffizi
Diptychs
Cranach
Nude art
Snakes in art